Legacy was a South African television drama telenovela series created by executive producers Phatutshedzo Makwarela and Gwidyon Benyon. It is an M-Net original production for premium subscription television channel M-Net produced by Tshedza Pictures. The series focuses on the Price family and the struggle for power over the Price empire after the death of the family's patriarch Sebastian Price. This is the channel's very first telenovela.

On 22 May 2021/15th Annual SAFTA, it won its first award for Best Telenovela category. The series finale episode aired in September 2022 after two successful seasons ( 416 episodes)

Plot 
Sebastian Price, the patriarch of the family is expected to retire from his position as CEO of Legacy Investments, an investment company he has built and operated for thirty years. He is also expected to announce his successor to the position he held. However, tragedy strikes which leads to his death. This leads to a power struggle within the family, as Sebastian  bitter ex-wife Angelique and his ruthless daughter Felicity do whatever it takes to make sure that Sebastian's second wife Dineo doesn't push her playboy son SJ into the ceo position at legacy investment.

Cast and Characters 
 Dineo Price (Kgomotso Christopher) Sebastian's current wife. She is a kind-hearted woman caught up in the ensuing drama. She is initially disinterested in her husband's wealth and CEO succession, but has a change of heart later in the series.
Felicity Price (Mary-Ann Barlow)  Sebastian and Angèlique's first born daughter. She is the main antagonist in the series who plots with her mother to get the CEO position at Legacy Investments.
Sebastian Price (Deon Lotz)

The patriarch of the family and well established businessman. He is the founder and CEO of Legacy Investments.

 Angélique Price (Michelle Botes)

Sebastian's ex-wife and lawyer. She is determined to get Sebastian's wealth. She plots and schemes with her daughter Felicity.

 SJ Price (Anton David Jefta)

Sebastian and Dineo's handsome and charming son. Petra Potgieter's love interest.

 Petra Potgieter (Trix Vivier) 

First jobless when we meet her, Petra Potgieter finds a job and love interest at Legacy Investments due to her brother Stefan's personal ties to one of the Price sisters

 Msizi Zulu (Siyabonga Thwala) 

A power-hungry, cunning man who would do anything to become the CEO of legacy investments and be seen as the man on top.

 Stefan Potgieter (Sean-Marco Vorster)

Petra's older brother who works as a driver for the Price family . Dangerous and ambitious, he is Felicity's lover and right-hand man.

 Williem Potgieter (Dawid Minnaar)

Stefan and Petra's dad who is a recovering alcoholic. He tries to protect his children from the powerful Price family.

References 

South African television series